Niko Tokić (born 6 July 1988) is a Croatian retired footballer who played as a striker. Tokić is a right-footed player who can also be deployed as an attacking midfielder.

Club career

FK Šiauliai
During his time with FK Šiauliai, Tokić enjoyed his most prolific spell in professional football thus far, scoring 19 goals in 35 league matches in the A Lyga, winning the league's Golden Boot award for the 2014 season in the process.

Hong Kong Pegasus 
After 2 prolific seasons playing for FK Šiauliai, with Tokić scoring a total of 26 goals in 68 competitive matches, Hong Kong club Hong Kong Pegasus expressed interest in signing him, and on 14 January 2015, it was reported that Tokić has agreed to an 18-month deal with the club, bringing an end to his 2-year stint with the Lithuanian side. Following his move, Tokić only managed to make a total of 9 competitive appearances for the Hong Kong side before the end of the season. He subsequently moved back to Croatia, where he joined NK Hrvatski Dragovoljac for the 2015–16 Druga HNL season.

NK Hrvatski Dragovoljac 
Following his departure from Hong Kong Pegasus, Tokić joined Croatian Second Football League side NK Hrvatski Dragovoljac. He scored 6 goals in 21 appearances, making his final appearance for the club on 21 May 2016, securing a 1-0 win over NK Dugopolje.

Balestier Khalsa 
On 31 May 2016, it was reported that Singapore club Balestier Khalsa was close to securing a transfer deal for Tokić to join the club midway through the 2016 S.League season, subject to a medical examination, the S.League's mandatory running test and the necessary paperwork. Earlier reports had stated the impending arrival of Tokić was to replace Croatian striker Robert Peričić, who was injured for the first half of the season. On 3 June 2016, it was confirmed that Tokić has officially signed professional terms with the club. Tokić made his full competitive debut for Balestier Khalsa on 10 June 2016, in a S.League match against Hougang United. He played the entire 90 minutes, scoring just 10 minutes into the game, his first for the club and the first goal of the match. The match subsequently ended in a 2–2 draw.

Career statistics

Honours

Individual
 A Lyga
 Golden Boot - 2014

References

External links
 

1988 births
Living people
Footballers from Zagreb
Association football forwards
Croatian footballers
NK Karlovac players
HNK Šibenik players
NK Varaždin players
HNK Cibalia players
FC Šiauliai players
NK Hrvatski Dragovoljac players
Balestier Khalsa FC players
NK Zagreb players
Croatian Football League players
A Lyga players
Hong Kong Premier League players
First Football League (Croatia) players
Singapore Premier League players
Croatian expatriate footballers
Expatriate footballers in Lithuania
Croatian expatriate sportspeople in Lithuania
Expatriate footballers in Hong Kong
Croatian expatriate sportspeople in Hong Kong
Expatriate footballers in Singapore
Croatian expatriate sportspeople in Singapore